The Fiftieth Anniversary Celebrations of Sultan Haji Hassanal Bolkiah's Accession to the Throne were the celebrations held throughout Brunei in October 2017 to celebrate the Sultan's Golden Jubilee; his 50th year on the Bruneian throne.

Background
According to the history of Brunei Sultanate, there were three rulers of the Sultanate who had ruled for 50 years and celebrate Golden Jubilee. The first monarch to celebrate Golden Jubilee in Brunei was Sultan Abdul Jalilul Akbar, the 10th Sultan of Brunei. Sultan Abdul Jalilul Akbar who ruled Brunei for 61 years, from 1598 until 1659, was known as the longest ruling Sultan to date. The Sultan celebrated his Golden Jubilee in the year 1648.

The second Bruneian monarch to celebrate Golden Jubilee was Sultan Omar Ali Saifuddin I, Brunei's 20th Sultan. Sultan Omar Ali Saifuddin I who ruled Brunei for 55 years, from 1740 until 1795, celebrated his Golden Jubilee in the year 1790.

On 5 October 2017, Brunei made its history when His Majesty Sultan Haji Hassanal Bolkiah Mu’izzaddin Waddaulah, the 29th Sultan of Brunei, become the third monarch to celebrate Golden Jubilee, marking his 50 years reign on the Throne of Brunei. Hassanal Bolkiah ascended the Throne as the 29th Sultan of Brunei on 5 October 1967 after following the voluntary abdication of his father, Sultan Omar Ali Saifuddien Saadul Khairi Waddien. The Sultan had celebrated his Silver Jubilee to mark the 25th year of his reign on the Throne on 5 October 1992.

In conjunction of his Golden Jubilee celebration, the Sultan declared Thursday, 5 October 2017 to be a public holiday.

Main Programmes

Royal ceremonies 
The Golden Jubilee celebrations of Sultan Hassanal Bolkiah's Accession to the Throne in October 2017 as follows:

All the Golden Jubilee ceremonies were broadcast nationwide by the Radio Television Brunei, the Brunei government's main broadcasting body.

Other Ceremonies

 Flag hoisting in conjunction of the Golden Jubilee Celebration, 1 October until 31 October 2017.
 Forum Melayu Islam Beraja (MIB) at all four district of Brunei-Muara, Tutong, Belait and Temburong, in conjunction of the Golden Jubilee Celebration, 2 October until 12 October 2017.

Foreign Guests

Heads of state and consorts

Heads of Government

Royal representatives

Commemorations

In conjunction of the Sultan's Golden Jubilee celebration, Brunei government and also private bodies through the Golden Jubilee Memorial Souvenir Sectorial Committee produce and sell commemorative merchandise and souvenirs to the public. Major broadcasting bodies also publish and sell photographs of the ceremonies.

The Brunei Information Department Department was given the rights to provide photographs and any informations needed about the Golden Jubilee for the use of local and foreign journalists and also to individuals. Government newspapers such as the Pelita Brunei and local media such as Media Permata and Borneo Bulletin made their special commemorative publications.

See also
 Hassanal Bolkiah
 Brunei
 List of Sultans of Brunei

References

External links
 – Official website of the Golden Jubilee Celebration.

Monarchy in Brunei
2017 in Brunei
Anniversaries
Ceremonies in Brunei
October 2017 events in Asia
Historical events in Brunei